Dunoon is a city in the Western Cape province of South Africa. The first erf for Dunoon was surveyed in 1996. As formal housing was built, shacks developed rapidly.

Dunoon is near the Killarney Motor Racing Complex. The township's neighbouring counterpart is Joe Slovo Park. Dunoon has no police stations; the nearest one is in Milnerton. In 2011, the population of Dunoon was 31,133 and the number of households was 11,496. The main form of transport for Dunoon residents is the minibus taxi; the MyCiTi bus service opened a bus station to serve Dunoon on 1 March 2014.

On the opposite side of Potsdam Road from Dunoon is an informal settlement called Site 5, which consists of a group of shacks. Dunoon has been known for its participation in violent, xenophobic demonstrations against foreign residents in the township.

Education

Dunoon has three primary schools and one high school: Dunoon Primary School, Sophakama Primary, Silverleaf Primary and Inkwenkwezi High School.

Health services 
The City of Cape Town opened a day hospital that is operating since 2016. The city officially opened a temporary clinic in conjunction with the Western Cape Provincial Government to provide better primary healthcare services to residents in the area. The clinic offers services such as reproductive health, HIV counselling and testing, tuberculosis treatment and screening, anti-retroviral treatment, among others.

Developmental plans

The City of Cape Town is the planning authority for Dunoon. It works to resolve a pedestrian trespass problem on the N7 road. Toilets and water standpipes have been removed from the road reserve, and there is a fence to discourage people from entering the N7 road reserve that is regularly repaired. Safety matters and the dangers of crossing the N7 have been discussed with the Dunoon community.

No footbridges have been planned because people usually take the shortest route regardless of safety.

A proposal to offer a safe crossing alternative involves lifting the N7 by approximately 2 metres over a section north of Richwood, which is between the future Blaauwberg Road and Potsdam Interchanges, so street links can be constructed at ground level to link the properties abutting the N7. The design process is underway but it will take about a year before construction can start.

The current temporary safety measure involves upgrading the existing agricultural underpass as an alternative to crossing the N7 for the Dunoon community. This has been a long process that requires the relocation of houses and the removal of people who live in the agricultural underpass. This upgrade was to be completed by early 2018.

Protest action
South African National Defence Force (SANDF) troops were deployed to Cape Flats, then arrived in Dunoon, on 1 October 2019 to carry out "targeted operations" against crime in the area, where disgruntled taxi operators led violent protests for days. Protests in the vicinity of Joe Slovo Park  continued for days. Cars were stoned, roads barricaded and bus stations targeted; at least one bus and a truck were set on fire. The protest was the result of a standoff between some taxi bosses and the city council, which refused to budge on demands for allocated transport routes and the scrapping of fines.

The township of Dunoon was calm after a combined force of the army and police units conducted a search and seizure operation. A large column of SANDF armoured personnel carriers, ambulances, and military police lined up in a MyCiTi bus lane beside two burnt-out bus stations.

COVID-19 de-densification
On 23 April 2020, the Western Cape Human Settlements Department began talking to Dunoon residents about plans to de-densify the area to slow the spread of COVID-19. The department said its rapid informal settlement support and upgrade programme would help with social distancing. To make de-densification work, the provincial government will provide temporary accommodation for 10,000 residents.

2020 arson attacks

On 21 June 2020, the City of Cape Town experienced a surge of arson attacks that targeted MyCiTi bus infrastructure, putting further strain on an already overstretched public transport system. As South Africa attempts to revive its economy after a prolonged period of lockdown, the public transport system was hit by a wave of protest and destruction.

The city's Mayoral Committee Member of Transport, Felicity Purchase, condemned the attacks, which have decimated public transport infrastructure in Milnerton and Dunoon. Purchase confirmed that a weekend of attacks on Cape Town buses have cost the city in excess of R8 million. Two MyCiTi buses were completely destroyed by flames. The Omuramba station in Racecourse Road, Montague Gardens, was also set on fire.

The area was since swarmed by law enforcement. Purchase condemned the destruction of public infrastructure, saying:

This weekend marks one of the worst in the 10-year history of the MyCiTi service, with violent attacks on assets and infrastructure in the Milnerton and Dunoon areas. This is nothing less but sabotage of the worst possible kind, and in a time of crisis when COVID-19 is challenging our resolve like never before.

The ongoing unrest in Dunoon was apparently linked to a lack of service delivery and contentious land grabs that has plagued the area over the past year. Earlier this month, a ward councillor – who spoke out against a criminal syndicate that was allegedly responsible for selling plots of land – was the subject of an arson attack. According to security guards at the scene, petrol bombs rained down on the councillor’s office on Youth Day.

Dunoon ward councillor Lubabalo Makeleni said, "The people that are burning the offices are the same people that are burning the drugs, but I've not yet met them. I still want to find out where they want to put up a shack so that we can go to them and talk to them."

Western Cape South African Police Service (SAPS) spokesperson Captain Frederick van Wyk confirmed that the area had been inundated by acts of violence and arson. Van Wyk said; "Sporadic incidents of public violence are currently taking place on Potsdam and N7 due to a dispute of allocation of housing".

References 

Suburbs of Cape Town
Townships in the Western Cape